The following are the winners of the 16th annual ENnie Awards, held in 2016:

Judges' Spotlight Winners 

Worlds in Peril (Samjoko Publishing) – Stacy Muth
Eclipse Phase: Firewall (Posthuman Studios) – Jakub Nowosad
Out of the Abyss (Wizards of the Coast) – Kayra Keri Küpçü
Sword Coast Adventure's Guide (Wizards of the Coast) – Kurt Wiegel

Gold and Silver Winners

References

External links
 2016 ENnie Awards

 
ENnies winners